The 2022–23 season is the 55th season in the existence of Fortuna Sittard and the club's fifth consecutive season in the top flight of Dutch football. In addition to the domestic league, Fortuna Sittard are participating in this season's edition of the KNVB Cup.

Players

Out on loan

Transfers

In

Pre-season and friendlies

Competitions

Overall record

Eredivisie

League table

Results summary

Results by round

Matches 
The league fixtures were announced on 17 June 2022.

KNVB Cup

References 

Fortuna Sittard seasons
Fortuna Sittard